Captains Courageous is a novel by Rudyard Kipling.

Captains Courageous may also refer to various film adaptations of the novel:

 Captains Courageous (1937 film), starring Spencer Tracy and Freddie Bartholomew
 Captains Courageous (1977 film), featuring Karl Malden and Johnny Doran
 Captains Courageous (1996 film), starring Robert Urich and Kenny Vadas